Pukch'ang County is a kun (county) in South P'yŏngan province, North Korea.

History 
In 1952, Pukchang County was formed from the former area of Maengsan County and Tokchon. Since then, the county has been changed multiple times by merging in or transferring out some areas.

In January 2000, Tukchang district was abolished and transferred to Pukchang County. However, the district reappeared in the 2008 North Korea Census.

Environment 
Pukchang County is located in a mountainous area. On the northern border with Tokchon runs the east-west Jangan mountain range. On the southern border with Unsan County, South Pyongan, the Chonsong mountain range also runs east-west. In the west of the county is the Mount Myohyang range. Around 80% of the county is forest.

The Taedong River runs through the county.

Administrative divisions
The district is split into 1 ŭp (town), 4 rodongjagu (worker districts) and 21 ri (villages):

Economy 
Built in the 1960s with Soviet assistance, Pukchang has the power station with the highest generating capacity in North Korea, with the Pukchang Thermal Power Complex having a generation capacity of 1600 MW, reached in December 1984. According to official statistics in 2009, it generated on average 1100 MW throughout the year. Different estimates puts the generating capacity at only 500 MW. The power plant suffered issues due to the low quality fuel oil provided by the USA under the Agreed Framework, which had a high sulfur content and thus would cause significant damage to the boilers. While an apparent replacement power plant with a capacity of 300 MW was being built in Kangdong County starting in 2014 due to aging of Pukchang Thermal Power Complex, the project appears to have stalled. It draws water from the Taedong River.

In December 12, 2018, an extension to the Pukchang Thermal Power Complex was inaugurated, likely as a result of an order of Kim Jong-un, calling for a 'drastic increase in thermal power generation'. According to Nknews sources, various cities had a marked improvement in electricity supply in 2018, although rural areas mostly relied on solar panels. The complex manufactures its own spare parts, such as turbine blades.

The county has a large number of coal mines, producing high quality coal, which supports the thermal power complex. Various other light industry exist in the county along with a number of farms, producing vegetables and raising animals.

The Pukchang Aluminum Factory, North Korea's only aluminum smelting and alloying plant has been condemned for releasing toxic dust over neighboring communities including offices, schools, homes, and businesses. The product of filters unreplaced since its construction in 1983, residents from the nearby community report high rates of birth defects, dermatitis, and respiratory disease contributing to an average life expectancy short of mid-50s. The "Class 1"-designated factory manufactures aluminum for North Korean missiles and centrifuges.

Transport 
The Pyongdok Line and Its branches, the Tukchang Line and Taegon Line passes through the county.

Roads connecting Pyongsong and Hamhung, Kumya and Pukchang, Tokchon and Pukchang run through the county.

References

External links
  Map of Pyongan provinces
  Detailed map

Counties of South Pyongan